Super Bonk  (released in Europe as Super B.C. Kid and in Japan as Super Genjin) is a 1994 2D side-scrolling platform video game by Hudson Soft for the Super Nintendo Entertainment System. It is the fourth game in the Bonk series. The game was later re-released for the Wii Virtual Console in Japan on November 16, 2010, in Europe on December 10, 2010, and in North America on April 4, 2011.

Gameplay
The fourth game in the regular Bonk series, Bonk is back on his first Super Nintendo Outing in this side scrolling adventure. The gameplay is similar to Bonk 3. Super Bonk allows Bonk to travel through time from his prehistoric levels to the insides of a dinosaur, a version of modern Chinatown, and the moon. Along the way, Bonk can find power ups that can change his form to creatures, such as a shooting Bonk Crab a dinosaur form called Big Kronk find candies that change his size from tiny to huge travel through transportation tubes and find multiple bonus levels. Bonk stills use his head to smash his enemies propeller seeds that allow bonk to fly and for the first time can carry flowers on his head in his continuing battle against his arch nemesis King Drool.

Reception

In their review, GamePro praised the clever usage of Bonk's various forms, the "crisp, cutesy quality" of the graphics, the easy controls, and the numerous bonus rounds, but nonetheless gave Super Bonk an overall negative assessment, concluding that platformer fans in general and Bonk fans in particular would find very little new content about the game. In 1995, Total! ranked Super Bonk 44th on its Top 100 SNES Games, summarizing: "Despite slightly awkward controls this is an amusing, well crafted and gripping platformer. It’s also very original in places."

References

External links
 Super Bonk at The Bonk Compendium (covering all games and references to Bonk series)
 Super Bonk / Super Genjin at Hardcore Gaming 101

A.I Company games
Super Nintendo Entertainment System games
Virtual Console games
Platform games
1994 video games
Bonk (series)
Prehistoric life in popular culture
Video games about time travel
Video games developed in Japan
Video games set on the Moon
Video games set in New York City
Video game sequels